Victorias may refer to:

Sports teams
 Edmonton Victorias, a women's ice hockey team in Edmonton, Alberta, Canada
 Moncton Victorias, a men's ice hockey team in Moncton, New Brunswick, Canada
 Montreal Victorias, a men's ice hockey team in Montreal, Quebec, Canada
 New York City Victorias, a men's American football team in NYC, NYS, USA; part of the American Football Union
 Ottawa Victorias, a men's ice hockey team in Ottawa, Ontario, Canada
 Pittsburgh Victorias, a men's ice hockey team in Pittsburgh, Pennsylvania, USA
 Regina Victorias, men's ice hockey teams in Regina, Saskatchewan, Canada
 St. Vital Victorias, a men's ice hockey team in St. Vital, Winnipeg, Manitoba, Canada
 Winnipeg Victorias, a men's ice hockey team in Winnipeg, Manitoba, Canada
 Winnipeg Victorias Rugby Club, a men's Canadian football team in Winnipeg, Manitoba, Canada

Other uses
 Victorias, Negros Occidental, Negros Island, Philippines; a city
 Las Victorias, Alta Verapaz, Guatemala; a national park
 Estadio Las Victorias, Chiquimula, Guatemala; a soccer stadium

See also

 Victoria's Secret, a clothing company, primarily women's lingerie
 Victoria (disambiguation)